Willy Corrêa de Oliveira (born 11 February 1938, in Recife) is a Brazilian modernist composer. He was one of the original signatories of the Grupo Música Nova's Manifesto in 1963, written by Rogério Duprat in 1963. He is also one of the founders and organizers of the Festival Música Nova, which takes place annually since 1962.

References

1938 births
Living people
Brazilian composers